Zacks is a surname. Notable people with the surname include:

Gordon Zacks (1933–2014), American businessman and writer
Jeff Zacks, American psychologist

See also
Zack (disambiguation)
Zaks (disambiguation)